Big Bad and Acoustic by The Choirboys sees the band perform acoustic tracks that they have put together over their two decades together.
The album was engineered by Adam Jordan and mixed by Robert Specogna at Main Street Studios, Wollongong.

Track listing 
"Last Night of My Life"
"Struggle Town"
"Run to Paradise"
"Hey Saint Peter"
"James Dale"
"Fuel"
"Fireworks"
"Cold Outside"
"Boys Will Be Boys"
"My Best Friend's Girl"
"Dream On"
"Boys in the Band"
"Bad Boy for Love"
"Never Gonna Die"
"Don't Say Goodbye"
"Empire"

2006 albums
The Choirboys (band) albums